Reinder Albertus Wolters (March 17, 1844 – January 3, 1917) was a professional baseball player from Nieuweschans, Netherlands. He played five seasons in the amateur National Association of Base Ball Players from 1866–70, and three seasons in its professional successor, the National Association from 1871-73. He was the first Dutch professional baseball player. While he was primarily a pitcher, he also played occasionally in the outfield.

His first and best professional season was in 1871 with the New York Mutuals, when he pitched 283 innings and had a 3.43 earned run average. His second year was with the Cleveland Forest Citys, where he played much less and had a higher ERA. In his last year, he only pitched one game, with the Elizabeth Resolutes. He completed it, giving up 23 runs, but none were earned. Wolters died in Newark, New Jersey, at the age of 72.

See also
 List of Major League Baseball annual runs batted in leaders

References

Sources

1844 births
1917 deaths
19th-century baseball players
Dutch baseball players
Major League Baseball pitchers
Major League Baseball players from the Netherlands
New Jersey Irvingtons players
New York Mutuals (NABBP) players
New York Mutuals players
Cleveland Forest Citys players
Elizabeth Resolutes players
People from Oldambt (municipality)
Sportspeople from Groningen (province)